Ab Sardan-e Olya Jowkar (also Romanized as Āb Sardān-e ‘Olyā Jowkār; also known as Āb-e Sard-e Now and Āb Sardān-e ‘Olyā) is a village in Margown Rural District, Margown District, Boyer-Ahmad County, Kohgiluyeh and Boyer-Ahmad Province, Iran. At the 2006 census, its population was 147, in 23 families.

References 

Populated places in Boyer-Ahmad County